Matt Hankin (born 3 April 1993) is an English professional rugby union player. He plays at flanker for Saracens. After a long-term injury with concussion he retired from Saracens at the end of the 2017/18 season.

References

External links
Premiership Rugby Profile
Saracens Profile

1993 births
Living people
Saracens F.C. players
English rugby union players
Rugby union players from Bromley
Rugby union flankers